Sir Henry Hervey Aston Bruce, 1st Baronet (6 September 17881822) was an Irish priest.

In 1785 he graduated Bachelor of Arts (BA) at Trinity College, Dublin. He was the brother of Sir Stewart Bruce, 1st Baronet. He married Letitia Barnard on 10 November 1786. He was created baronet, of Downhill in the Baronetage of the United Kingdom, in 1804. He was succeeded in his title by his son, James Bruce.

References

1788 births
1822 deaths
Alumni of Trinity College Dublin
Baronets in the Baronetage of the United Kingdom
Church of Ireland priests
19th-century Irish Anglican priests